The House E. S. Lobkova is a mansion in the center of Moscow (Big Tolmachevsky lane, house 5, building 7). Built in 1807 in Empire style. Currently, it is the representative office of the Altai territory. The house of E. S. Lobkova has the status of an object of cultural heritage of Federal importance.

History and architecture 

House in Bolshoi Tolmachevsky pereulok was built 1807 for podporujici Ekaterina Pubic. Since 1852 it belonged to merchants Medyntsev, since 1861 — merchants Losev.

Originally the mansion was U-shaped in plan. In the 1850s, extensions were made from the yard. In the 1860s, the mezzanine, where the loggia was built, was redesigned. At the beginning of the XXI century the mansion was restored. Now it houses the representative office of the Altai territory.

The house has two floors and a wooden mezzanine. The Central part of the mansion is allocated with a small risalit and a fluted pilaster portico of the second floor, topped with a frieze with metopes and triglyphs. Above it is the most expressive detail of the house-a deep loggia of the mezzanine, fenced with a thin metal lattice. The ceiling of the loggia is visually supported by two moulded bracket. Above the Windows of the second floor stucco decorations are placed. To the left of the house is the pylon of the gate with a gate.

References 

Cultural heritage monuments of federal significance in Moscow
Buildings and structures completed in 1807